Bjørklia is a small village area in Oppdal municipality in Trøndelag county, Norway. The village lies along the European route E06 highway and the Dovrebanen railway line, on the southeastern edge of the Trollheimen mountain range.

References

Villages in Trøndelag
Oppdal